Darver Castle is a fortified tower and manor house located in Readypenny, Dundalk, County Louth, Republic of Ireland, dating back to the 12th century. The name "Darver" is derived from the Gaelic word "Dairbhe" meaning "Oakwood."

History
Following the second stage Norman invasion of Ireland in 1171, King Henry II of England granted 500 acres of land to Patrick Babe, who erected a fortified tower on some high ground within the land granted to him. The original buildings on the site of Darver castle would have been wooden; the stone tower visible today was added c. 1432. Despite preparations for the possibility of a siege, there is no record of any siege being attempted at Darver castle.

In 1740 the Babe family sold Darver Castle to Randal Booth, and Booths descendants lived at Darver until 1980. In 1997 the castle was sold to the Carville family, who have renovated and refurbished it, turning it into a luxury hotel, wedding venue and restaurant.

References

External links
 Darver Castle website
 Darver Castle (International website)
 Darver National School website

Buildings and structures in Dundalk
Castles in County Louth
Houses in County Louth
Houses in the Republic of Ireland
Tower houses in the Republic of Ireland